Kenyan hip hop is a genre of music and a culture that covers various forms and subgenres of hip hop and rap originating from Kenya. It is most commonly a combination of Swahili and English (Kenya's official languages) as well as Sheng and a variety of tribal languages.

Development
As hip hop gained recognition in the global music scene in the late 1980s and early 1990s, it became increasingly common in Kenyan media. As most American rappers were of African descent, Kenyan youths felt represented and inspired, and started emulating them by wearing African American urban fashion; exchanging albums, mix tapes, hip hop magazines such as Word Up and The Source; and reciting song lyrics and rapping in English. The movement spread further when matatus painted with graffiti started playing rap music, and some Kenyan artists started releasing rap-influenced songs.

According to Alicia Rebensdorf, initially there was a strong correlation between rap music and wealth in Nairobi in the 1990s. The extremely high cost of rap CDs, magazines, merchandize, and music equipment led the genre to be initially exclusive to middle- and upper-class youths. Music videos were a primary source of exposure to the global rap/hip-hop music scene and culture. In this visual medium, the social and cultural meanings of lyrics were overshadowed by the "visual images of wealth and the verbal speed of the rappers", producing a "relatively materialistic notion of rap music and hip-hop culture".

According to the documentary Hip-Hop Colony, the beginnings of Kenyan hip hop was like a "new breed of colonialism," transplanting the original styles from the Westernized world to Africa. However, Kenya has not only embraced but also appropriated the genre, creating its own distinct version. Since its explosion in the mid-1990s, Kenyan hip hop is now generally written and performed in English, Swahili, and Sheng, a slang combination of the two.

Artists

Notable artists 
Many artists are well known in Kenya for their style and methods of rapping. Many new groups and solo artists have emerged as the scene has diversified. Among the most famous artists are Kalamashaka, Ukoo Flani, Necessary Noize, Monski, Hardstone, Gidi Gidi Maji Maji, Bamboo, Nameless, Jua Cali, King Kaka, Octopizzo, Wawesh, the late E-Sir, Khaligraph Jones, Stella Mwangi, Ab Naz, Camp Mulla (who were nominated for Best International Act (Africa) at the 2012 BET Awards), Abbas Kubaff, STL, Nafsi huru, and Wangechi.

History 
In 1990, the teenage singer and producer Ricky Oyaro made the initial impact on the Kenyan music scene with the hip-hop/R&B single "Renaissance", which triggered a renaissance in the then-ailing Kenyan music industry. The song received massive airplay on radio and Music Time on Kenyan television. Jimmy Gathu, one of the earliest known rappers on the Kenyan scene, would soon follow with his 1991 hit "Look, Think, Stay Alive", a song dealing with road safety. Soon after, more and more Kenyan youths started rapping on TV. The show Mizizi, which aired on the Kenya Broadcasting Corporation, gave young rappers a platform to express themselves, giving rise to Kenyan hip hop.

The first major commercial hip hop hit emerged in 1996 with "Uhiki" by Hardstone (Harrison Ngunjiri), which sampled a Kikuyu folk song and Marvin Gaye's "Sexual Healing", and was produced by Tedd Josiah of Audio Vault Studios (now Blue Zebra). Other popular pioneering acts were Kalamashaka with their national hit "Tafsiri Hii", K-South with "Nyabaga Kodo Gakwa" (which was also sampled from a Kikuyu folk song), and Poxi Presha with his breakout hit "Dhako Kelo".

Gidi Gidi Maji Maji became well-known in 1999 for their song "Ting Badi Malo", and released their debut album Ismarwa the following year. They went on to release their popular and politically charged hit "Unbwogable" in 2002; the word took on the meaning of "unshakable", "unstoppable", or "unbeatable" and was subsequently used by major politicians and in reference to 2008 US presidential candidate Barack Obama.

In 2006, Ukoo Flani Mau Mau was awarded Best Song (Hip Hop) at the 2006 Kisima Music Awards for "Punchlines Kibao", featuring Vigeti (Kalamashaka, Kimya, and Ibra da Hustla (Nako 2 Nako)). The song was produced by Musyoka and recorded at Andaki Studios, deep in the heart of Dandora, Kenya's home of hip hop.

Subgenres 
Ogopa Deejays term their style of music as "boomba" or "kapuka", while Calif Records initiated a new style known as genge. Genge, which roughly translates to "large crowd of people", reinforced a foundational ethos of hip hop as a music for and by the people.

In 2006, Influx Swagga (one of the earliest genge artists) rebranded to Swagga and proposed that all subgenres of Kenyan music be merged into one brand called "Sheng music", which would make it easily identifiable in the international market, like Bongo Flava from Tanzania. However, the proposal failed to gather support from genge, kapuka, and boomba stakeholders.

In 2014, AD Family crafted the name "shrap" for their genre of rap music. The name is a merger of "Sheng" and "rap".

In late 2017 until mid-2018, an offshoot of Kenyan hip hop named "gengetone" emerged, pioneered by Ethic Entertainment, Boondocks Gang, The Kansoul, Rico Gang, and Ochungulo Family. Although the subgenre rose steadily in popularity among Kenyan teenagers and young adults, negative remarks from the general public and the Kenyan music production board led to its gradual downfall. Though it is considered dead, records are still occasionally released.

In recent years, a subgenre known as Kenyan drill—a fusion of UK drill with English, Kiswahili, and Sheng—has risen in popularity, pioneered by artists such as Wakadinali and Buruklyn Boyz, and popularized by artists like Big Yasa, Geri Soweto, Davaji, and Natty.

Awards 
The first all-Kenyan hip hop awards ceremony, the UnKut Africa Hip Hop Awards, was held virtually in 2018 and in-person in December 2019 with over 10,000 votes cast. The event was hosted by UnKut Africa, an entertainment organization founded by Ruby V.

References

Hip hop
Hip hop
Hip hop by country